Učakovci is a settlement on the left bank of the Kolpa River southwest of Vinica in the Municipality of Črnomelj in the White Carniola area of southeastern Slovenia. The area is part of the traditional region of Lower Carniola and is now included in the Southeast Slovenia Statistical Region.

There are two wayside shrines in the settlement. One was built after a flood in  1874 and is dedicated to Saint Nicholas. The second is dedicated to Our Lady of Sorrows and dates to the 19th century.

References

External links
Učakovci on Geopedia

Populated places in the Municipality of Črnomelj